The Justice Unity Party was a Thai pro-military and conservative political party established after the military coup d'état of 1991. It was founded by Narong Wongwan, who became party chairman, and Thiti Nakornthap, who was close to the National Peace Keeping Council. Samakkhi Tham represented the interests of the military, bureaucracy and provincial business owners.

Justice Unity Party 
The party enjoyed the support of junta leader Air Chief Marshal Kaset Rojananil. The Justice Unity Party won the parliamentary election in March 1992 and nominated Suchinda Kraprayoon to become prime minister. In the following conflict between the military-backed government and the pro-democratic movement, Thai media counted the party among the so-called "devil parties". After the bloody crackdown on the oppositional movement ("Black May"), the party was discredited and most of its representatives deserted it to join more promising parties, mainly the National Development Party.

Liberal Party

Liberal Party was a briefly-functioning Thai political party formed from the remnants of the Justice Unity Party in June 1992.  was the party leader and Sompong Amornwiwat was the secretary.

Name change
The Justice Unity Party changed the name of the party to the Thoet Thai party on 9 July 1992, which was announced by the Government Gazette on 22 July 1992.

Dissolution
After running the Thoet Thai party shortly Anuwat and the party executive committee announced their resignation and membership of the entire Thoet Thai party on 10 August 1992. In September 1992 the party's executive committee resigned and the party ceased political activity. No candidates stood in the election on Sunday 13 September 1992.

The Supreme Court therefore ordered the Supreme Court 4098/1992 dated 24 December 1992 to dissolve the Thoet Thai party on 26 February 1993.

References

 Bangkok Post, "Same old faces?", 27 October 1991

Defunct political parties in Thailand
Political parties established in 1991
Political parties disestablished in 1992
1991 establishments in Thailand
Conservative parties in Thailand